Kushagra Nayan Bajaj is the Promoter and Non-Executive Chairman of the Bajaj Group of Companies which includes Bajaj Hindusthan Sugar Limited, Bajaj Consumer Care Limited, and Bajaj Energy Limited. At 45, Mr. Bajaj is among India’s youngest and brightest business leaders helming a diverse set of companies with a major interest in the Sugar, Power, and FMCG sectors. Under his stewardship, the Group has transformed itself to become a leaner, more focused, growth-oriented entity with a 21st-century, innovation-driven outlook.

Early life and background 
Kushagra Bajaj is the son of Shishir Bajaj, Rahul Bajaj’s younger brother. With a B.Sc. in Economics, Political Philosophy, and Finance from Carnegie Mellon University and M.Sc. in Marketing from the Northwestern University (Chicago), Mr. Bajaj’s academic qualifications are matched only by his business pursuits and a clear-eyed vision for the nearly century-old Group. Scion of a storied business family, Mr. Bajaj follows in the footsteps of his predecessors, chiefly his great-grandfather Shri Jamnalal Bajaj, the venerated businessman philanthropist, and freedom fighter. Shouldering the weight of a legacy built on the ideas of trust, transparency, inclusivity, and service to the nation, Mr. Bajaj is counted among the country’s leading philanthropists with a special interest in education.

Career 
In August 2001, Mr. Bajaj became the Chief Executive Officer and took charge of the overall responsibility for Bajaj Hindusthan Sugar and Bajaj Consumer Care leading the expansion and diversification of the businesses. Bajaj Group’s growing operational footprint, industry profile, and enhanced profitability have been the hallmarks of his tenure. As of today, the revenues of the Group stand at USD 2.0 billion with an assets base of USD 5.3 billion. A champion of inclusive growth and working for the common good, he also remains one of the principal guiding forces behind the Bajaj Foundation, the Group’s philanthropic arm engaged in social welfare programs in the farthest corners of the country.

Awards and Achievements 
In 2007, Mr. Kushagra Bajaj received the Young Achiever award at the 10th Rajiv Gandhi Awards. He donated $2.5 million to endow a professorship at Tepper School of Business at CMU, his undergraduate alma mater.

References

Living people
Bajaj Group
Indian billionaires
Indian corporate directors
Tepper School of Business alumni
Kellogg School of Management alumni
1977 births
Northwestern University